A list of films produced in Japan in 1950 (see 1950 in film).

See also
1950 in Japan

References

External links
Japanese films of 1950 at the Internet Movie Database

1950
Lists of 1950 films by country or language
Films